Vyjayanthimala (born 13 August 1936) is an Indian actress, Bharathanatyam dancer, Carnatic singer, dance choreographer and parliamentarian. She was the highest-paid actress of her time. Regarded as the "first female superstar" and "Megastar" of Indian cinema, She made her debut in the Tamil language film at the age of 13 with Vaazhkai in 1949 and in the Telugu film Jeevitham in 1950. She later became one of the most prominent actresses of South Indian cinema and in the golden era of Bollywood and was known as one of the iconic leading actresses of all time. Vyjayanthimala acted in Bollywood movies Bahar and Ladki. Following the success of Nagin, Vyjayanthimala established herself as one of Bollywood's leading actresses while making inroads in successful Tamil and Telugu films. After successfully establishing herself as a commercial actress, Vyjayanthimala appeared in Devdas, playing Chandramukhi, the hooker with a heart of gold, in 1955. In her first dramatic role, she received her first Filmfare Award for Best Supporting Actress at the 4th Filmfare Awards, where she refused to accept the award citing that hers was not a supporting role, being the first person to refuse a Filmfare Award. Following that, Vyjayanthimala appeared in series of blockbuster films such as New Delhi, Naya Daur and Aasha. She reached the pinnacle of her success in 1958 when two of her films — Sadhna and Madhumati — became huge critical and commercial hits. She was nominated for two Filmfare Award for Best Actress Award for Sadhna and Madhumati and won the award for the former. At this point, Vyjayanthimala made comeback to Tamil films, where she tasted commercial success with Vanjikottai Vaaliban, Irumbu Thirai, Baghdad Thirudan and Then Nilavu. In 1961, the release of Dilip Kumar's Ganga Jumna saw her playing a rustic village belle, Dhanno, who speaks the Awadhi dialect. Critics applauded her performance, while some labeled it her best to date. She won her second Filmfare Award for Best Actress for her role in Ganga Jumna. Beginning in 1962, most of her films performed either averagely or poorly at the box office. However, in 1964, with the success of Sangam, her career hit its peak again. She reinvented herself by playing a modern Indian girl appearing in revealing costumes and a one-piece swimsuit. She went to receive her third Best Actress Award at the 12th Filmfare Awards for her role as Radha in Sangam. She later achieved critical acclaim for her performance in the historical drama Amrapali, which was based on the life of Nagarvadhu, royal courtesan of Vaishali, Amrapali. The film received universal acclaim, but it was a huge box office failure, which left Vyjayanthimala, who had huge expectations of the film, disenchanted to the point where she decided to quit films. In the end of her career Vyjayanthimala was mostly seen in commercially successful films such as Suraj, Jewel Thief and Prince with a few critically acclaimed films such as Hatey Bazarey and Sunghursh. Most of them were released after Vyjayanthimala left the film industry (a total of app. 65 films).

Filmography

As an actress
{|class="sortable wikitable"
! Year
! Film!! Role !! Language !! Notes 
|-
| 1949
| Vazhkai || Mohana Shivashankaralingam || Tamil || On-screen debut & Tamil debut 
|
|-
| rowspan="2" |1950
| Jeevitham || Mohini Sivashankara Lingeswara Prasad || Telugu || Shot simultaneously in original Tamil as Vaazhkai and also, Telugu debut! 
|
|-
| Vijayakumari|| Western dancer || Tamil || Guest appearance
|
|-
| 1951
| Bahar || Lata || rowspan="2" |Hindi || Bollywood film debut 
|
|-
| 1953
| Ladki || Rani Mehra || 
|
|-
| rowspan="6" |1954
| Penn || Rani || Tamil || Shot simultaneously with Ladki
|
|-
| Sangham || Rani || Telugu || Shot simultaneously with Ladki and last Telugu film 
|
|-
| Nagin || Mala || rowspan="2" |Hindi ||
|
|-
| Pehli Jhalak || Beena || 
|
|-
| Asha Nirasha || Asha || Kannada || CompletedUnreleased
|
|-
| Miss Mala || Mala || rowspan="8" |Hindi ||
|
|-
| rowspan="4" |1955
| Yasmin|| Yasmin || 
|
|-
| Sitara || Veda || 
|
|-
| Jashan || Seema/Malti || Dual Role 
|
|-
| Devdas || Chandramukhi || Won the Filmfare Award for Best Supporting Actress, but
refused the award!|
|-
| rowspan="7" |1956
| Taj || Princess of Roopnagar || 
|
|-
| Anjaan || Ratna || Also known as Somewhere in Delhi
|
|-
| New Delhi || Janki Subramaniam || Dubbed in Russian language as Индия
|
|-
| Marma Veeran || Rajkumari Vijaya || Tamil ||
|
|-
| Patrani || Princess Mrinalla || rowspan="9" |Hindi ||
|
|-
| Kismet Ka Khel || Anokhi || 
|
|-
| Devta || Naagrani || 
|-
| rowspan="4" |1957
| Naya Daur|| Rajni || Dubbed into Tamil as Pattaliyin Sabatham
|
|-
| Kathputli || Pushpa || 
|
|-
| Ek Jhalak || Mala || 
|
|-
| Aasha || Nirmala || 
|
|-
| rowspan="6" |1958
| Sitaron Se Aagey || Kanta || 
|
|-
| Sadhna || Rajni/Champa Bai || Dual Role and also won the Filmfare Award for Best Actress
|
|-
| Vanjikottai Valiban || Princess Mandakini || Tamil ||
|
|-
| Raj Tilak || Princess Mandakini || rowspan="5" |Hindi || Shot simultaneously in Tamil as Vanjikottai Valiban
|
|-
| Madhumati || Madhumati / Madhavi / Radha (Triple Role) || Nominated-Filmfare Award for Best ActressIndia's official entry to the Oscars
|
|-
| Amar Deep || Meena/Aruna || Dual Role ||
|
|-
| rowspan="3" |1959
| Paigham|| Manju || 
|
|-
| Jawani Ki Hawa ||  Latha || 
|
|-
| Athisaya Penn || Nirmala || rowspan="4" |Tamil ||
|
|-
| rowspan="5" |1960
| Raja Bakthi|| Princess Mrinalini || 
|
|-
| Parthiban Kanavu || Kundhavi || 
|
|-
| Irumbu Thirai || Manju || 
|
|-
| College Girl ||  Kamla || Hindi ||
|
|-
| Baghdad Thirudan || Zarina || rowspan="2" |Tamil ||
|
|-
| rowspan="4" |1961
| Then Nilavu|| Shanthi || 
|
|-
| Nazrana || Vasanti || rowspan="6" |Hindi ||
|
|-
| Gunga Jumna || Dhanno || Won the Filmfare Award for Best ActressBFJA Award for Best Actress
|
|-
| Aas Ka Panchhi || Neena Bakshi || 
|
|-
| rowspan="3" |1962
| Rungoli|| Nirmala "Nimmo" || 
|
|-
| Jhoola || Sumati || 
|
|-
| Dr. Vidya || Geeta / Dr. Vidya || 
|
|-
| 1963
| Chittoor Rani Padmini|| Princess Rani Padmini of Chittor || Tamil || Last Tamil film 
|
|-
| rowspan="5" |1964
| Zindagi|| Beena || rowspan="9" |Hindi ||
|
|-
| Sangam || Radha || Won the Filmfare Award for Best ActressFirst technicolor film of Raj KapoorDubbed in Russia as Сангам|
|-
| Phoolon Ki Sej || Karuna || 
|
|-
| Leader || Princess Sunita || First Indian film to be shot outside of the 1.37:1 ratioShot in 1.85:1 ratio
|
|-
| Ishaara || Mala || 
|
|-
| 1965
| Naya Kanoon|| Jyothi || 
|
|-
| rowspan="3" |1966
| Do Dilon Ki Dastaan||  || 
|
|-
| Amrapali || Amrapali || India's official entry to the Oscars
|
|-
| Suraj || Princess Anuradha Singh || 
|
|-
| rowspan="3" |1967
| Hatey Bazarey|| Chhipli ||Bengali ||
|
|-
| Chhoti Si Mulaqat || Roopa Chaudhary || rowspan="8" |Hindi ||
|
|-
| Jewel Thief || Shalini Devi Singh / Shalu || 
|
|-
| rowspan="3" |1968
| Sunghursh|| Munni/Laila-E-Aasmaan || Dual Role and also won the BFJA Award for Best Actress
|
|-
| Saathi || Shanti || 
|
|-
| Duniya || Mala ||  
|
|-
| rowspan="2" |1969
| Pyar Hi Pyar|| Kavita || 
|
|-
| Prince || Princess Amrita || 
|
|-
| 1970
| Ganwaar|| Parvati or nicknamed as "Paro" || Last film 
|
|}

As choreographer

As producer

As playback singer

Miscellaneous Crew

See also
 List of awards and nominations received by Vyjayanthimala

References

External links
 
  Vyjayanthimala profile at Upperstall.com''

Indian filmographies
Actress filmographies